Benga may refer to:

Ethnonym 
 Benga people, an indigenous ethnic group of Equatorial Guinea
 Benga language, spoke by the Benga people
 Benga music, a genre of music originating in Kenya

Places

Romania 
 Benga, the old name of Movileni, Olt, a commune in Romania

Gabon 
 Benga, Gabon, a province of Nyanga Province
 Benga, Mozambique, a town in Mozambique

People 
 Benga (surname)
 Benga (musician) (born 1986), English dubstep producer

Other uses
 Benga tree, a common name for Pterocarpus marsupium
 Beng language of Côte d'Ivoire

Language and nationality disambiguation pages